Fatoot is a group of Yemeni dishes based on shredded bread.

References

Yemeni cuisine